Richard Francis Stelmaszek (October 8, 1948 – November 6, 2017) was an American Major League Baseball catcher, and bullpen coach for the Minnesota Twins.

Stelmaszek spent 32 consecutive seasons (–) on the Twins' coaching staff and was the longest-tenured coach in Minnesota history. Stelmaszek trails only Nick Altrock, who spent 42 consecutive years (–) as a coach with the old Washington Senators (the predecessor to the Twins' franchise), and Manny Mota, who worked as a Los Angeles Dodgers coach for 34 straight years (1980–2013), as the longest-tenured coach in continuous service with one franchise in MLB history.

Early years
Stelmaszek was drafted on June 6, 1967, by the expansion edition of the Senators in the eleventh round of the 1967 Major League Baseball Draft out of Mendel High School in Chicago, but didn't sign until August 28, keeping him from his minor league debut until 1968. The following year, Stelmaszek was assigned to low Single-A Geneva Senators and spent time between this team and the high Single-A Salisbury Senators. In 1969, he was back at Single-A, this time for the Shelby Senators in the Western Carolina League and played well, hitting .288 with 5 home runs and making the league All-Star team. In 1970, Stelmaszek was promoted to the AA Pittsfield Senators and despite his overall production at the plate dropping (hitting only .246 with 4 home runs and 47 runs batted in in 128 games), he was again named to the league all-star team. 1971 would see him promoted to the AAA Denver Bears where he hit only .247 with almost no power (1 home run, 1 triple and 1 double in 73 games), but he earned a call up and made his major league debut on June 25. However, after going hitless in nine at-bats, he was back in the minors within a month.

Major League career
He was batting .143 in seven games with the Texas Rangers when he was dealt along with Mike Epstein and Rich Hand to the California Angels for Lloyd Allen and Jim Spencer on May 20. Stelmaszek would last only 22 games with the Angels and spent most of the season at AAA with the Salt Lake City Angels.

Stelmaszek started the  season back with Salt Lake City, but was traded to the Chicago Cubs on July 28 for Horacio Piña. He hit his only career Major League home run as a member of the Cubs on August 20 against Don Sutton of the Los Angeles Dodgers. 

Prior to spring training , Stelmaszek was dealt to the New York Yankees for Gerry Pirtle, and he spent the season at AAA Syracuse, with the exception of a brief call-up to the Yankees' Major League roster in April, during which he did not get into any games. Stelmaszek would spend 1978, his last year playing organized ball, with the Minnesota Twins at Single A Wisconsin Rapids as a player-manager.

Coaching career
After retiring as a player at the end of the 1978 season, Stelmaszek was hired on as the full-time manager of the Rapids. In , he was named Midwest League Manager of the Year after leading his team to a 77–64 record. Following the season, he joined the Twins' major league coaching staff under Johnny Goryl.

The Twins signed him to a contract extension through  in November . Stelmaszek missed spring training and the first month of the 2011 season due to eye surgery. Former Twins catcher Phil Roof served as his replacement during his recovery. On October 3, 2012, following a 2–1 season-ending loss to the Toronto Blue Jays which capped the first back-to-back 96-loss seasons for the Twins, interim General Manager Terry Ryan announced the firing of Stelmaszek after 32 seasons with the club.

Stelmaszek was diagnosed with pancreatic cancer in December 2016.  On April 3, 2017, he was honored to throw out the first pitch at Target Field as the Twins opened their 57th season. Beforehand, he explained his goal: "Throw the ball and then walk from the mound to the dugout without falling." Stelmaszek died on November 6, 2017, aged 69.

Longtime Twins reliever Glen Perkins had this to say following Stelmaszek's death:

References

External links

Rick Stelmaszek at Pura Pelota (Venezuelan Professional Baseball League)

1948 births
2017 deaths
American people of Polish descent
Baseball players from Chicago
California Angels players
Chicago Cubs players
Deaths from cancer in Illinois
Deaths from pancreatic cancer
Denver Bears players
Florida Instructional League Senators players
Geneva Senators players
Hawaii Islanders players
Indianapolis Indians players
Major League Baseball bullpen coaches
Major League Baseball catchers
Minnesota Twins coaches
Minor league baseball managers
Navegantes del Magallanes players
American expatriate baseball players in Venezuela
Pittsfield Senators players
Salisbury Senators players
Salt Lake City Angels players
Shelby Senators players
Syracuse Chiefs players
Texas Rangers players
Tucson Toros players
Washington Senators (1961–1971) players
Wichita Aeros players
Wisconsin Rapids Twins players